Bad Axe may refer to:

Bad Axe, Michigan
Bad Axe High School
Bad Axe, Wisconsin, the name of Genoa, Wisconsin until 1868
Bad Axe River, river in Wisconsin
Bad Axe Massacre in Wisconsin
Bad Axe (album), an album by Son Seals
Bad Axe (film), a 2022 film